The 2018 World of Outlaws Craftsman Sprint Car Series was the 40th season of the winged sprint car series sanctioned by World Racing Group, competing throughout the United States. The season began with the DIRTcar Nationals at Volusia Speedway Park on February 9, and ended with the World of Outlaws World Finals at The Dirt Track at Charlotte on November 3. Donny Schatz defended his 2017 championship by winning his tenth title in 2018.

The 2018 season was the first to feature live video broadcast of every event available via pay-per-view on DIRTvision.

The season was marred by the death of Jason Johnson, following the race at Beaver Dam Raceway on June 23.

Teams and drivers

Driver and team changes 

 - Tim Kaeding ran the #7S Sides Motorsports car for three races during the west coast swing for owner points. Jason Sides, who was also racing full-time on the WoO circuit, ran the #7SS car for those races.
 - Parker Price-Miller and Destiny Motorsports moved to a part-time effort with the Outlaws during the first California swing. The team was to chase points with the All Star Circuit of Champions tour instead for 2018.
 - Clyde Knipp moved to a part-time effort following the race at Nodak.

Schedule and results
All races were broadcast live by DIRTvision.com except the 5-hour ENERGY Knoxville Nationals, which was broadcast live by thecushion.com.

 ≠ indicates the race was canceled
 ≈ indicates the race was a non-points event

Schedule notes and changes
 February 23 race at Cotton Bowl Speedway was postponed due to weather conditions. The race was rescheduled for April 25.
 East Texas Lonestar Showdown (February 24) at Lonestar Speedway was canceled due to weather conditions.
 SoCal Showdown (March 3) at Perris Auto Speedway was canceled due to weather conditions.
 March 10 race at Thunderbowl Raceway was canceled due to weather conditions.
 Night #1 of the FVP Platinum Battery Western Spring Shootout (March 16) at Stockton Dirt Track was canceled due to weather conditions.
 Brad Sweet Placerville Short Track Shootout presented by NAPA Auto Parts (March 21) at Placerville Speedway was postponed due to weather conditions. The race was rescheduled for September 12 as the 49er Gold Rush Classic presented by Riebes NAPA.
 Ocean Outlaw Showdown (March 23) at Ocean Speedway was canceled due to weather conditions.
 April 13 race at Jacksonville Speedway was postponed to June 27 due to weather conditions.
 April 14 race at Tri-State Speedway was postponed due to weather conditions. The race was rescheduled for April 22.
 April 22 race at Tri-State Speedway was postponed for the second time this season due to weather conditions. The race was rescheduled for May 13.
 April 25 race at Cotton Bowl Speedway was postponed for the second time due to weather conditions. The race was rescheduled for April 26.
 Gettysburg Clash (May 16) at Lincoln Speedway was postponed due to weather conditions. It was originally postponed to May 17, and again to July 19 when inclement weather persisted.
 Night 1 of the Morgan Cup (May 18) at Williams Grove Speedway was canceled due to weather conditions.
 Night 2 of the Morgan Cup (May 19) at Williams Grove Speedway was canceled due to weather conditions.
 May 22 race at Bridgeport Speedway was cancelled due to weather conditions.
 May 30 race at Fairbury American Legion Speedway was postponed due to weather conditions. The race was rescheduled to June 5.
 June 22 race at Farley Speedway was canceled due to weather conditions.
 June 27 race at Jacksonville Speedway was postponed out of respect for the Johnson family and to allow drivers, officials and crews to grieve the loss of a fellow friend and competitor. The race was rescheduled for October 12.
 Night 2 of the Champion Racing Oil Summer Nationals (July 21) at Williams Grove Speedway was canceled due to weather conditions.
 July 25 race at Airborne Park Speedway was canceled due to weather conditions.
 Tuscarora 50 (September 8), originally an event sanctioned by the All Star Circuit of Champions, was postponed due to weather conditions. The race was rescheduled for October 27th, and was added to the World of Outlaws schedule as the All Star Circuit of Champions season was already complete.
 October 12 race at Jacksonville Speedway was canceled due to weather conditions.
 Nittany Showdown (October 26) at Port Royal Speedway was canceled due to weather conditions.
 Tuscarora 50 (October 27) at Port Royal Speedway was postponed to October 28 due to rain.
 Night 2 of the World of Outlaws World Finals (November 2) at The Dirt Track at Charlotte was postponed due to weather conditions. The race was rescheduled for November 3.

See also
 - 2018 World of Outlaws Craftsman Late Model Series
 - 2018 Super DIRTcar Series

References

World of Outlaws Sprint Car seasons
World of Outlaws Craftsman Sprint Car Series